Corbell is a surname. Notable people with the name include:

Jeremy Kenyon Lockyer Corbell (born 1977) American artist and filmmaker
Simon Corbell (born 1970) former Australian politician 
Jerome Branch Corbell, a main character in the novel A World Out of Time

See also
Nolwenn Korbell (born 1968), French singer-songwriter
Corbel (disambiguation)
Korbel (disambiguation)